Eucalyptus megacarpa, commonly known by its Noongar name of bullich, is a species of robust mallee or small to medium-sized tree with a scattered distribution in the forests of the south-west of Western Australia. It has smooth bark throughout, lance-shaped to curved adult leaves, flower buds in groups of three, white flowers and cup-shaped, bell-shaped or hemispherical fruit.

Description
The bark is smooth throughout, mottled grey, reddish-grey or white. Flowering occurs between April and November and the flowers are white.

Taxonomy
Eucalyptus megacarpa was first formally described by the botanist Ferdinand von Mueller in 1860 in Volume 2 of Fragmenta phytographiae Australiae from samples collected by George Maxwell near Wilson Inlet in 1858. The specific epithet (megacarpa) is a Latin word meaning "large-fruited".

Distribution and habitat
Bullich grows in forest near swamps and along the banks of streams, although the mallee or smaller tree form is found on hillsides. It occurs from near Perth to Cape Leeuwin, Albany and the Stirling Range in the Esperance Plains, Jarrah Forest, Swan Coastal Plain and Warren bioregions where it grows in sand and sandy loam soils over limestone.

Conservation status
This eucalypt is classified as "not threatened" in Western Australia by the Western Australian Government Department of Parks and Wildlife.

Use in horticulture
The tree is sold commercially either in seed form or as tube stock. It grows well in a full sun position, will tolerate extended dry period and light frost. The tree can grow in a variety of soil types. It has an average growth rate and is grown as a shade tree in bush style gardens where it attracts birds.

See also
List of Eucalyptus species

References

External links

megacarpa
Myrtales of Australia
Trees of Australia
Eucalypts of Western Australia
Plants described in 1860
Taxa named by Ferdinand von Mueller
Endemic flora of Southwest Australia